Coprinopsis aesontiensis is a species of mushroom producing fungus in the family Psathyrellaceae.

Taxonomy 
It was first described in 2016 by the Italian mycologists Andreas Melzer, Giuliano Ferisin & Francesco Dovana and classified as Coprinopsis aesontiensis based on DNA analysis.

Description 
Coprinopsis aesontiensis is a small grey mushroom found rarely in North Eastern Italy.  

Cap: Up to 30mm wide by 20mm tall. Campanulate (bell shaped) or conical. Grey with small white tufts or powdery scales. Gills: Start white maturing to dark brown. Crowded. Stem: 60-80mm long and 6-8mm in diameter. Slightly bulbous base. White with small hairs or downy tufts. Spores: Ellipsoid with a germ pore. 9.6-10.6 x 5-6 μm. Taste: Indistinct. Smell: Indistinct.

Habitat and distribution 
The species was discovered in the North Eastern Friuli Venezia Giulia region of Italy which borders Austria and Slovenia. Its distribution remains unclear.

Etymology 
The specific epithet aesontiensis is named for the Aesontius river, a historical name for the Isonzo river in Slovenia.

Similar species 
DNA analysis shows that Coprinopsis pulchricaerulea is closely related. However this species has a blue cap as opposed to grey and is found in the subtropical rainforests of Australia.

References 

Psathyrellaceae
Coprinopsis